The 1958 Montana State Bobcats football team was an American football team that represented Montana State College (now known as Montana State University) as an independent during the 1958 NCAA College Division football season. In its first season under head coach Herb Agocs, the team compiled an 8–1 record.

Schedule

References

Montana State
Montana State Bobcats football seasons
Montana State Bobcats football